Glór na nGael ("voice of the Gaels") is an Irish-language organisation funded by Foras na Gaeilge which promotes Irish in three sectors: the family, community development, and business. It was established as a competition between community groups in 1961, and Cardinal Tomás Ó Fiaich and Monsignor Pádraig Ó Fiannachta were among its founders.

The competition has grown over the years and encompasses both community groups and third-level college groups as well as an international element (Global Gaeilge) and since 2014 a project with the Gaelic Athletic Association to promote Irish in GAA Clubs, called An Turas Teanga (the language journey).

Glór na nGael is the Irish publisher of the Scrabble word game, and in 2015 it also published the Irish-language version of the Monopoly board game.

External links
Glór na nGael

Irish-language mass media